Rocky's Knife is a 1967 West German thriller film directed by Joachim Mock and starring Michael Miller, Karl-Josef Cramer and Thomas Rau.

Cast
 Michael Miller as Rocky
 Karl-Josef Cramer as The Long One
 Thomas Rau as Elois
 Christine Dass as Lu
 Barbara Ratthey as Knife-Kitti
 Heidrun Kussin as Eva
 Uwe Pietsch as Chicago
 Manfred Kunkel as Blacky
 Dietrich Stephan as Mauke
 Wolfgang Priewe as Klaus
 Mildred Wuest as Karin
 Arthur Binder
 Gerda Blisse
 Dieter Kursawe
 Ulrich del Mestre

References

Bibliography
 Peter Cowie & Derek Elley. World Filmography: 1967. Fairleigh Dickinson University Press, 1977.

External links

1967 films
West German films
1960s thriller films
German thriller films
1960s German-language films
1960s German films